Oh! This Bavaria! is a 1960 West German comedy film directed by Arnulf Schröder and starring Rudolf Vogel, Liesl Karlstadt and Jürgen von Alten.

Cast

References

Bibliography

External links 
 

1960 films
West German films
1960s German-language films
German films based on plays
Films set in Bavaria
Films set in the 1900s
German historical comedy films
1960s historical comedy films
1960 comedy films
1960s German films